Dive is the second studio album released by Japanese singer Maaya Sakamoto. As the first album, Yoko Kanno produced this album as well. Lyrics of the album's songs were written by Sakamoto and Yūho Iwasato, except "Baby Face" and "Heavenly Blue" were co-written with Tim Jensen.

Track listing

Charts

References

1998 albums
Maaya Sakamoto albums
Albums produced by Yoko Kanno
Victor Entertainment albums